The canton of Gap-Campagne is a former administrative division in southeastern France. It was disbanded following the French canton reorganisation which came into effect in March 2015. It had 5,054 inhabitants (2012).

The canton comprised the following communes:
La Freissinouse
Gap (partly)
Manteyer
Pelleautier
Rabou
La Roche-des-Arnauds

Demographics

See also
Cantons of the Hautes-Alpes department

References

Former cantons of Hautes-Alpes
2015 disestablishments in France
States and territories disestablished in 2015